Dois is the second studio album by Brazilian rock band Legião Urbana. It was released in July 1986 and produced by Mayrton Bahia, which was at that time assigned by EMI-Odeon to produce the label's newcomers. The booklet has a picture of a couple hugging each other and photographed from behind; it was taken by Ico Ouro Preto, former guitarist turned-photographer of the band.

Background 
The success of previous album (which by then had already sold 100,000 copies) made vocalist, acoustic guitarist and keyboardist Renato Russo contemplate releasing their sophomore album as a double one, with the title Mitologia e Intuição (Mythology and Intuition). The label wasn't impressed with the idea and the album was done as a single one. Russo was experiencing the "second album syndrome", as guitarist Dado Villa-Lobos said. Legião Urbana's critical and commercial success made him want to surpass the achievements on the second release. Drummer Marcelo Bonfá said the album "was really a challenge, because we had a deadline to create and there was much expectation, both from the label and from the band itself.

The album ended up being the band's most commercially successful one, helped by the success of "Eduardo e Mônica", a song that was considered difficult due to the lack of a chorus. The album sold over 1.8 million copies.

Songwriting 
About the album's lyrics, Russo said, following its release:

The band composed in a manner that was considered "unusual". Sometimes they presented a rhythm section with no melody, or they came up with fragments of songs without even knowing where they would be used. Besides that, they started to work more with acoustic guitars. "Andrea Doria" was one of the tracks that received some parts with the instrument in order to please the members.

The album's mixing was also toilsome. The album was recorded through 16 channels and many times the instruments would end up mixed together and would have to be separated with handicraft-like methods. Tracks were constantly edited, many times by three people at once. It was during this album's recording sessions that the band started to accept more effects in their music.

Song information 
A verse from "Tempo Perdido" inspired the title of Russo's biopic Somos Tão Jovens (We're So Young). It was already part of the live repertoire of the band before being recorded.

"Fábrica", just like "Perfeição" (from O Descobrimento do Brasil), was covered in Spanish by Argentinian band Attaque 77.

The album opener "Daniel na Cova dos Leões" starts with some radio chatter, some sections of the previous album's "Será" and parts of the Socialist International's Anthem. "Plantas Embaixo do Aquário" mentions the Cold War. In order to add it to the album's final track list, Russo took inspiration from a letter Bahia wrote him after he realized the musician felt highly pressured.

"Química", which would be in the group's next release, is featured in Dois as a bonus track, but only in the cassette version, in a different arrangement than the one that would be released on Que País É Este.

"Andrea Doria" references the Italian ship SS Andrea Doria, which was en route to New York on 25 July 1956 and sank after colliding with Stockholm. Unlike the Titanic tragedy, most passengers were rescued and the death toll was of 51 souls, plus some Italian works of art.

Reception

Critical reception 

In 2007, the Brazilian edition of Rolling Stone magazine featured Dois in the 21st position on a list of the 100 greatest Brazilian albums. In September 2012, it was elected by the audience of Radio Eldorado FM, of Estadao.com e of Caderno C2+Música (both the latter belong to newspaper O Estado de S. Paulo) as the third best Brazilian album ever. By the time of the album's release, the newspaper also said: "You bite it and see there is meat there. Bleeding. The little taste of Smiths on side A, with lyricist and vocalist Renato Russo singing a lot on Daniel na Cova dos Leões or Tempo Perdido, actually just prepares the ground for the punch of side B, as in Metrópole and Fábrica."

Commercial reception

Track listing

Personnel
 Renato Russo - vocals, keyboards, rhythm guitar, acoustic guitar, bass guitar (on "Acrilic on Canvas" and "Eduardo e Mônica")
 Dado Villa-Lobos - lead guitar
 Renato Rocha - bass guitar, keyboards (on "Acrilic on Canvas")
 Marcelo Bonfá - drums, percussion

References

 

1986 albums
Legião Urbana albums